Prospecton is an industrial suburb located south of Durban in KwaZulu-Natal, South Africa.

History 
Since 1931, the open flat undeveloped land of Prospecton which separates the two residential areas of Isipingo, Isipingo Rail inland and Isipingo Beach on the coast, was under the administration of the Isipingo Rail Health Committee. This was until the 1960s when it began developing and was declared a "White" industrial area therefore it placed under the Borough of Amanzimtoti. 

Many residents of Isipingo disagreed with the administration of Prospecton being under Amanzimtoti and the Isipingo Town Council petitioned the Natal Provincial Administration (NPA) frequently from 1976 to 1986 to incorporate Prospecton into Isipingo. The NPA maintained that, because Prospecton had been declared a "White" industrial township by the South African government, the province could not declare it part of Isipingo as it was an "Indian" area.

Location 
Prospecton lies 19 km south-west of Durban's city centre and south of the defunct Durban International Airport, which was replaced by the King Shaka International Airport in La Mercy in 2010. It forms part of the South Durban Basin which is the main industrial hub/district of Durban and is the southernmost industrial suburb of the district.

It is bordered by the defunct Durban International Airport to the north, Isipingo Beach to the east, Amanzimtoti to the south, Lotus Park to the south-west and Isipingo Rail to the west.

Economy 
It is the location of the Toyota South Africa's assembly plant, the only Toyota assembly plant in Africa. The industrial suburb consists mainly of large manufacturing plants and warehouse / distribution facilities.

Transport 
The N2 freeway cuts through the area and links to Durban in the north and Amanzimtoti and Port Shepstone in the south. Prospecton's main roads include the R102 Prospecton Road which links to Amanzimtoti in the south and Isipingo, Reunion and Durban in the north as well as Jeffels/Joyner Road which links the eastern and western side of Prospecton.

References

Suburbs of Durban